The Coyote Hills are a low mountain-hills range in Plumas County, California.

References 

Mountain ranges of Northern California
Mountain ranges of Plumas County, California